Yi Seung-Hun (1756 – April 8, 1801, Ja: Jasul (子述), Ho: Mancheon, baptismal name Peter) was one of the first Catholic martyrs in Korea.

Biography 
He was born in 1756 in Seoul. His father was Soam Yi Dong-uk (蘇巖 李東郁, 1739-?) from the Pyeongchang clan, who rose to the rank of champan (vice-minister) and, after possible initial interest, fiercely opposed the spread of Catholic teachings. His mother was a sister of Yi Ga-hwan (李家煥, 1742-1801), one of the Catholics executed with him in 1801. 

Yi Seung-hun first came into contact with Catholicism via Yi Byeok in 1779. In 1783-4, he accompanied his father on a diplomatic mission to Beijing, China, and on the suggestion of Yi Byeok contacted the Catholic priests there. He was baptised in Beijing in the spring of 1784. This was the first time that a member of the Korean yangban class was formally baptised as a Christian and he returned to Korea with books, crucifixes, and other Catholic artifacts. Yi Byeok then seems to have taken some time to study the books before declaring himself convinced. He then set about evangelizing those around him, including Gwon Cheol-sin and his younger brother Gwon Il-sin. This was also the moment when he spoke of the Catholic faith to the brothers Jeong Yak-jong, Jeong Yak-jeon, and Jeong Yak-Yong (who recorded the event in his epitaph myojimyeong.

It was only after Yi Byeok felt fully convinced that he authorized Yi Seung-hun to baptise himself and the other converts to Catholicism. Early in 1785 the growing group of believers and sympathizers in Seoul moved their regular gatherings for worship from the house of Yi Byeok to that belonging to another convert, Kim Beom-u, on the hill where Myeongdong Cathedral now stands. Almost immediately the authorities raided the house, suspecting it of being a gambling den, and were embarrassed on finding it full of nobles. Yi Seung-hun was among those named in the official report of the incident. After the death of Yi Byeok later that year, Yi Seung-hun took over his role in the group. In the spring of 1786, as there were yet no formally ordained priests in Korea, Various leading Korean laymen, including Choi Chang-Hyon, Yi Tan-won, began acting as "temporary clerics". In 1789, however, the Korean Catholics were informed by the bishop in Beijing, Mgr. Gouvea, that such practices were contrary to Church teachings and that they should cease. There would be no ordained priest in Korea until 1795, when the Chinese priest Zhu Wenmiao arrived, at which time the Church had grown to over 4000 members. Yi Seung-hun and Jeong Yak-jong were the main leaders of the community in Seoul after the death of Yi Byeok in 1786. Yi Seung-hun's wife was Jeong Yak-jong's sister.

In 1801, the Korean Catholic Church was subject to the first major repression by the government (the Sinyu Persecution) in which more than 300 people were killed. Yi was martyred by beheading on the 26th of the 2nd lunar month (April 8), 1801. This incident has come to be known as the Catholic Persecution of 1801. Little written material remains from this period but a collection of texts by several of the first believers, known as Mancheon yugo (蔓川遺稿), was discovered in about 1970. Mancheon was the ho of Yi Seung-hun, whose writings occupy a major part of the book, together with texts written by Yi Byeok etc. It is not known when or by whom the collection was made, and although it is sometimes claimed to be in the handwriting of Jeong Yak-yong, this does not seem to be the case.

See also
 Roman Catholicism in South Korea
 Korean Martyrs
 Seohak

References

External links
 "한국 천주교회 창립성현 만천 이승훈 베드로 (1756∼1801)" Early Korean Catholic martyrs (한국어)
 History of the Asian Missions - Introduction of Catholicism into Korea
 Chon Jin Am, The Birthplace of the Catholic Church in Korea
 Academy of Korean Studies database entry for Yi Seung-hun in Korean

1756 births
Converts to Roman Catholicism
Joseon Christians
Korean Roman Catholics
People from Seoul
1801 deaths